Jasin District is one of the three administrative district in Malacca, Malaysia. It borders Tangkak District of Johor to the east, Tampin District of Negeri Sembilan to the north and Alor Gajah District and Melaka Tengah District to the west. The district capital is Jasin Town.

History

The early establishment of Jasin started since the establishment of small settlement by the local people. They chose an area near river mainly for their water supply, communication and agricultural purpose. To sustain life, they planted paddy and grew vegetables and fruit.

Geography

Jasin District is the largest district in Malacca occupying 41.47% of the state area. The Kesang River runs through the center of Jasin Town. The Kesang River separates the new town from the old town center. Almost 75% of the district area is flat plain, located not more than 50 meters above sea level.

Administrative divisions

Jasin District is divided into 20 mukims:

Demographics

Federal Parliament and State Assembly Seats 

Jasin district is divided with two federal constituencies with northern part of Jasin in Alor Gajah constituency while the rest of district in Jasin constituency.
 
List of Jasin district representatives in the Federal Parliament (Dewan Rakyat) 

List of Jasin district representatives in the State Legislative Assembly (Dewan Undangan Negeri)

Economy

Major businesses are mainly conducted by the Malays with a handful of Chinese, South Indians and Gujaratis. Jasin was known for its best Nasi Lemak especially in Kesang most peaceful place in Jasin District, it was made from generation to generation in Malay culture, also Kuih and Mee Bandung.

The Gujaratis in Jasin are mainly furniture dealers and the Mavani family has a monopoly. Run by generations of family members till today, the Mavani family business has flourished to be one of the most successful entrepreneurs in the city. Another popular shop on the same row is the Chen Sing Stationery Shop which sells stationery, magazines, comics and newspapers. There are two major banks in Jasin: Maybank and CIMB, which are also Malaysia's biggest banks.

Because the district has been designated as a water catchment area, industrialization is restricted to around the towns of Jasin and Merlimau. A large proportion of the land is used for the growing of rubber trees, oil palm and fruits. The area is also known for its durian fruits.

The old town center of Jasin Town consists of mainly 1920s 2-storey shophouses where small businesses is conducted on the ground floor and the owner lives above. Modern commercial buildings adorn the new town area and only one bridge over the Kesang River connects the new town to the old town.

Industrial areas 
 Elkay Industrial Park
 Jasin Industrial Park
 Serkam Industrial Area

Infrastructure

Medicine

Jasin boasts a new government hospital, Jasin Hospital, which replaced the old one that was fast becoming insufficient to meet the needs of the growing population. The hospital also serves as a teaching hospital for Malacca Manipal Medical College.

Besides the hospital, other government healthcare facilities include
 7 community clinics
 9 dental clinics
 22 klinik desa (village clinics)

Education

There are about 19 schools in Jasin district. Schools such as MRSM Tun Ghafar Baba, SMK Iskandar Shah and SMK Dang Anum are examples of schools that are well known in Malaysia. The Malaysia Institute of Aviation Technology, part of the Universiti Kuala Lumpur, is also located in Jasin. Other schools are listed below:

 MRSM Tun Ghafar Baba (MARA Junior Science College of Tun Ghafar Baba)
Jalan Sempang Kerayong,
77000 Jasin,
Malacca.
 Institut Kemahiran MARA (MARA Skills Institute)
Jalan Chinchin, Simpang Kerayong
Peti Surat 141, 77000
Jasin, Malacca

 SBP Integrasi Selandar (Selandar Integrated Boarding School)
Jalan Batang Melaka,
77500 Selandar,
Malacca.

 SMK Iskandar Shah (Iskandar Shah Secondary School)
Jalan Kelubi,
77000 Jasin,
Malacca.

 SMK Dang Anum (Dang Anum Secondary School)
Jalan Jasin,
77300 Merlimau,
Malacca.

 SMK Tun Perak (Tun Perak Secondary School)
Jalan Bunga Tanjung (Jalan Taman Maju),
77000 Jasin,
Malacca.

 SMK Datuk Bendahara (Datuk Bendahara Secondary School)
Jalan Pegawai,
77000 Jasin,
Malacca.

 SMK Seri Bemban (Seri Bemban Secondary School)
Jalan Ayer Panas,
77200 Bemban,
Malacca.

 SMK Simpang Bekoh (Simpang Bekoh Secondary School)
Jalan Asahan,
77100 Jasin,
Malacca.

 SMK Selandar (Selandar Secondary School)
Pejabat Pos Selandar,
77500 Selandar,
Malacca.

 SMK Sungai Rambai (Sungai Rambai Secondary School)
Jalan Parit Putat,
77400 Sungai Rambai,
Malacca.

 SMK Jasin (Jasin Secondary School)
Jalan Bunga Tanjung,
77000 Jasin,
Malacca.

 SMK Sri Mahkota (Sri Mahkota Secondary School)
KM16, Umbai,
77300 Merlimau,
Malacca.

 SMK DARY (SMK Datuk Abdul Rahman Ya'kob) (DARY Secondary School)
Jalan Jasin,
77300 Merlimau,
Malacca.

 SMK Teknik Jasin (Jasin Technical Secondary School)
Jalan Kemendor,
77000 Jasin,
Malacca.

 SMK Nyalas (Nyalas Secondary School)
Jalan Melangkan,
Nyalas, 77100 Asahan,
Malacca.

 Politeknik Merlimau (Merlimau Politechnic)
Karung Berkunci 1031,
Pejabat Pos Merlimau,
77300 Merlimau,
Malacca.

 Universiti Teknologi MARA (MARA Technology University)
77000 Jasin,
Malacca.

 Kolej Komuniti Jasin (Jasin Community College)
77000 Jasin,
Malacca.

 Kolej Komuniti Selandar (Selandar Community College)
Jalan Batang Melaka,
77500 Selandar,
Malacca.

 Pusat Lagenda Program Latihan Khidmat Negara (PKLN) Asahan
KM 69, Jalan Kolam Air,
Mukim Chabau,
77100 Asahan,
Malacca.

Tourist attractions

 Acehnese Headstone
 Agricultural Museum
 Asahan Waterfall
 Bukit Langsat Recreational Forest
 Chinchin Lake Extreme Park
 Datuk Senara Mausoleum
 Demang Abdul Ghani Gallery
 Jasin Square
 Portuguese Well
 Selandar Agro Park
 Serkam Jamek Mosque
 Serompol Tehel Recreational Park
 Sultan Ali of Johor Mausoleum, Umbai Mukim
 Tun Teja Mausoleum

 Jus Reservoir

Shopping
 Fresh and Convenient Store (Fresco)
 Jasin Shopping Centre
 MYDIN Mall Jasin Bestari
 Econsave
 Jasin Point Family Store
 Merlimau Street Mall (Upcoming)
 Plaza Bestari (Under Construction)
 Cafe Hipster Baruk Escape and Fishing Pond

Transportation

Jasin town center is about half-an-hour drive away from Malacca City. From nearby Asahan it is possible to ascend the peak of Mount Ledang in Johor. Asahan is a border town boasting waterfalls. Jasin also borders Tangkak District, particularly the town of Tangkak in Johor. The two towns are about ten minutes' drive away from each other.

See also

 Districts of Malaysia

References